Lygropia disarche is a moth in the family Crambidae. It is found in French Guiana.

The wingspan is about 13 mm. The forewings are bronzy-brown with two erect yellowish white bars. The hindwings are whitish costally at the base.

References

Moths described in 1914
Lygropia